A Help key, found in the shape of a dedicated key explicitly labeled , or as another key, typically one of the function keys, on a computer keyboard, is a key which, when pressed, produces information on the screen/display to aid the user in their current task, such as using a specific function in an application program.

In the case of a non-dedicated Help key, the location of the key will sometimes vary between different software packages. Most common in computer history, however, is the development of a de facto Help key location for each brand/family of computer, exemplified by the use of F1 on IBM compatible PCs.

Apple keyboards

As of 2007, new Apple keyboards do not have a help key. In its place, a full-sized Apple keyboard has a  instead. Instead of a mechanical help key, the menu bar for most applications contain a Help menu as a matter of convention.

Commodore and Amiga keyboards
The Commodore 128 had a  key in the second block of top row keys. Amiga keyboards had a  key, labelled as such, above the arrow keys on the keyboard, and next to a  key (where the  cluster is on a standard PC keyboard).

Atari keyboards
The keyboards of the Atari 16- and 32-bit computers had a  key above the arrow keys on the keyboard. Atari 8-bit XL and XE series keyboards had dedicated  keys, but in the group of differently-styled system keys separated from the rest of the keyboard.

Sun Microsystems (Oracle)
Most of the Sun Microsystems keyboards have a dedicate "" key in the left top corner (left from the "" key above block of 10 extra keys.

References 

Computer keys
Online help